On 3 July 1990, 1,426 people were suffocated and trampled to death in a tunnel near Mecca during the Hajj.

Event

The incident occurred inside a 550-meter-long (1800 feet) and 10-meter-wide (35 feet) pedestrian tunnel (tunnel Al-Ma'aisim) leading out from Mecca towards Mina and the Plains of Arafat.  The tunnel had been worked on as part of a $15 billion project around Mecca's holy sites started two years earlier by the Saudi government.

While pilgrims were traveling to perform the ritual Stoning of the Devil at 10:00 a.m. the disaster started when a pedestrian bridge railing was bent, causing seven people to fall off a bridge and onto people exiting the tunnel.  The tunnel's capacity of 1,000 soon filled with as many as 5,000 people.  With outside temperatures of 44 °C / 112 °F, a failure of the tunnel's ventilation system was also blamed for many of the deaths.  Some witnesses claimed they believed a demonstration was occurring; others reported that the power to the tunnel was deactivated.  Saudi officials concluded that crowd hysteria occurring from the falling pilgrims was the cause.

Many who died were of Malaysian,  Indonesian and Pakistani origin.  According to one Malaysian account, 80 percent of the deaths occurred outside the tunnel, and 20 percent (about 285) were inside.

Reactions

Immediately after the event, King Fahd stated that the event was "God's will, which is above everything", adding that "had they not died there, they would have died elsewhere and at the same predestined moment".  About 680 of those who died were Indonesians, and Indonesian officials criticized the Saudi government, saying it "cannot run from the responsibility for the tunnel disaster simply saying it was an act of God".  Iran also expressed concerns after the incident, and Turkey issued a brief complaint.  Calls for an international investigation were rejected by the Saudis.

References

1990 in Saudi Arabia
20th century in Mecca
Disasters in religious buildings and structures
Incidents during the Hajj
Human stampedes in 1990
Hajj Stampede
Human stampedes in Saudi Arabia
1990 disasters in Saudi Arabia